Daniel Miceli (born September 9, 1970) is an American former major league baseball relief pitcher.

Early career
Miceli began playing baseball during his senior year at Dr. Phillips High School in Florida where he was teammates with Brian Barber and won a single game as a pitcher. Miceli received an offer to play college baseball at Polk Community College and was not selected in the Major League Baseball draft. He signed with the Kansas City Royals after seeing an advertisement for an open tryout in the Orlando Sentinel.

Miceli never saw time at the major league level for Kansas City. Instead, he was dealt to the Pittsburgh Pirates (July 31, 1993) with pitcher Jon Lieber in exchange for pitcher Stan Belinda. Miceli made his major league debut on his birthday, September 9, 1993.

The Pirates tried Miceli as both a starter and in the bullpen, but the right-hander found his niche as a reliever, collecting a career high 21 saves in 1995. Unfortunately, Miceli battled a high ERA in Pittsburgh, a tendency that has followed him throughout his career. The Pirates then traded Miceli to the Detroit Tigers (November 1, 1996) for pitcher Clint Sodowsky.

Miceli's stint in the Motor City was short, but productive, recording over 82 innings all in relief. The oft-traded reliever was moved once again to the San Diego Padres with fellow pitcher Donne Wall and minor leaguer Ryan Balfe, for outfielder Trey Beamon and reliever Tim Worrell.

Miceli was an important piece of the Padres' 1998 National League Champion team. An ineffective 1999 campaign saw Miceli on the move again, this time to the Florida Marlins.

Frequent Flyer Miles
From 2000 through 2005, Miceli's services were sought by contenders and non-contenders alike, as teams attempted to fill vacancies in their bullpen. Miceli made stops in Florida, Texas, Cleveland, New York, Colorado (three times), Houston and even an overseas stay in Japan as member of the Yomiuri Giants.

On July 29, 2003, Miceli became part of the Astros relief corps. In 2004, Miceli went 6-6 with a respectable 3.59 ERA, and made career highs in games (74) and strikeouts (83). Miceli also made his second postseason trip that season, coming within a game of another World Series berth. While he was a significant bullpen contributor during the regular season, he pitched poorly in the postseason. Particularly, in the NLCS he posted a 27.00 ERA in only 1.1 innings pitched and received losses in two crucial games. In contrast to his solid 2004 season, his performance in Japan was one of the worst in his career, losing 2 consecutive games to the Hiroshima Toyo Carp and Yokohama BayStars, which were his first two games. This resulted in him becoming the player released after the shortest amount of time (4 games) in Giants' history.

On January 12, 2006, the journeyman signed on with his tenth team, the Tampa Bay Devil Rays, agreeing to a two-year deal. Part of a closer by committee system in Tampa, Miceli earned four saves and held opponents to a .217 batting average. A majority of Miceli's season was lost due to a right shoulder injury. The veteran righty entered as a candidate for the Rays' closer in 2007. Poor results during spring training cost the well traveled reliever a spot on Tampa Bay's forty-man roster, and on March 29, Miceli was released from the team.

In 631 career games, Miceli had a 43-52 record, with 4.48 ERA. He collected 632 strikeouts, and 310 walks in just over 700 innings pitched. Miceli also had 39 career saves, and had two singles in 22 at-bats.

Boston Red Sox
On January 22, 2008, Miceli signed with the Boston Red Sox on a minor league contract with invitation to spring training. He announced his retirement on March 1, 2008.

Long Island Ducks
Despite announcing his retirement, Miceli joined the Long Island Ducks for the 2009 season.

References

External links

1970 births
Living people
American people of Italian descent
Baseball players from Newark, New Jersey
Long Island Ducks players
Pittsburgh Pirates players
Texas Rangers players
Detroit Tigers players
Tampa Bay Devil Rays players
New York Yankees players
San Diego Padres players
Major League Baseball pitchers
American expatriate baseball players in Japan
Yomiuri Giants players
Colorado Rockies players
Florida Marlins players
Cleveland Indians players
Houston Astros players
Carolina Mudcats players
Buffalo Bisons (minor league) players
Gulf Coast Marlins players
Brevard County Manatees players
Colorado Springs Sky Sox players
2006 World Baseball Classic players
Dr. Phillips High School alumni